Trojanów  is a village in Garwolin County, Masovian Voivodeship, in east-central Poland. It is the seat of the gmina (administrative district) called Gmina Trojanów.

The village has a population of 686.

References

Villages in Garwolin County